Chapman High School may refer to:

Chapman High School (Kansas)
Chapman High School (Inman, South Carolina)